Welsh Harp ward is a political division of the London Borough of Brent that returns three representative Councillors and at the 2006 election was held by the Labour Party Francis Eniola, Mary Farrell, and Harbhajan Singh.

References
 Welsh Harp ward profile

Wards of the London Borough of Brent